El Palomar is a town in the urban agglomeration of Greater Buenos Aires in Argentina.

The city has the peculiarity of being divided between two partidos of Buenos Aires Province: Morón, where it is called El Palomar, and Tres de Febrero, where it is called Ciudad Jardín Lomas del Palomar. Of its 74,751 inhabitants, 57,146 live within the Morón jurisdiction and 17,605 live in Tres de Febrero.

El Palomar was established with a station by that name belonging to the Buenos Aires and Pacific Railway opened in 1910. Developer Publio Massini sold the first lots on November 8 of that year, and Juan Manuel Giuffra established the El Palomar Development Council, which obtained electric lighting for the area in its early years. The city is home to the National Military College, the 1st Air Brigade of the Argentine Air Force, and El Palomar Airport.

The Italian Society of Tiro al Segno (Target Shooting) (S.I.T.A.S.), is located in Palomar. Horse riding, tennis, soccer, yoga, shooting, hockey, bodybuilding, and other sports can be practiced here. In an annex is the training venue for rugby and hockey.

French automaker PSA Peugeot Citroën has a manufacturing plant in the area as well.

El Palomar is served by Ferrocarril General San Martín commuter rail service at El Palomar station with easy access to Retiro Station in downtown Buenos Aires, as well as by National Route 7.

Ciudad Jardín Lomas del Palomar 

Inaugurated in 1944, Ciudad Jardín was conceived with the idea of creating a garden city that offered a balance of urban life with green spaces, a city within a city.

Climate

Education

The area once had a German school, Gartenstadt Schule *.

History

References

External links 

ROTARY CLUB EL PALOMAR
www.guiapalomar.com Official website 
Ciudad Jardín Lomas del Palomar 

Morón Partido
Tres de Febrero Partido
Populated places in Buenos Aires Province
Populated places established in 1910
Cities in Argentina
Argentina